The 1990 Great Britain Lions tour was a tour by the Great Britain national rugby league team of Papua New Guinea and New Zealand which took place from May to July 1990.

Touring squad
An initial 28-man squad was selected for the tour in April 1990. Warrington's Des Drummond and Widnes' David Hulme and Paul Hulme were all unavailable for selection for "private reasons".

Ellery Hanley, Steve Hampson, Les Holliday, Shaun Edwards, Andy Platt and Paul Loughlin all withdrew from the originally selected squad for various reasons. Mike Gregory was chosen as tour captain as a result of the absence of Hanley and Edwards.

Papua New Guinea

First Test

Second Test
This was Great Britain's second match in the 1989-1992 Rugby League World Cup

New Zealand

Presidents XIII:  Morvin Edwards, Warren Mann, Mark Nixon, Paddy Tuimavave, Sam Panapa, Dean Clark, Stu Galbraith, Adrian Shelford, Peter Ropati, George Mann, Taime Tagaloa, Francis Leota, Mike Kuiti. Res - Kelly Shelford, Esene Faimalo

Great Britain:  Chris Bibb, John Devereux, Daryl Powell, Jonathan Davies, Carl Gibson, Garry Schofield, Bobbie Goulding, Ian Lucas, Martin Dermott, Keith England, Denis Betts, Paul Dixon, Phil Clarke. Res - Roy Powell, David Bishop

Canterbury:  Hall, Whetu Taewa, Michael Dorreen, Rodger, Kaisa, Mark Nixon, Aaron Whittaker, Ricky Cowan, Wayne Wallace, Simanu, Leck, Culley, Logan Edwards. Res - Angell, Seru.

Great Britain:  Alan Tait, Paul Eastwood, Shaun Irwin, Joe Lydon (c), Roger Simpson, Graham Steadman, Deryck Fox, Ian Lucas, Lee Jackson, Karl Fairbank, Ian Smales, Gary Price, David Bishop. Res - Roy Powell, Mike Gregory

Auckland:  Paddy Tuimavave, Mike Patton, Sam Panapa, Iva Ropati, Warren Mann, Mike McClennan, Stu Galbraith, Peter Brown, Peter Ropati, Se'e Solomona, Tawera Nikau, Taime Tagaloa, Tony Tuimavave. Res - Francis Leota

Great Britain:  Chris Bibb, Carl Gibson, Joe Lydon, Garry Schofield, Jonathan Davies, Graham Steadman, Bobbie Goulding, Kelvin Skerrett, Martin Dermott, Keith England, Denis Betts, Roy Powell, Mike Gregory (c). Res - Alan Tait, Paul Dixon

Kiwi Colts:  Paul Nahu, Hall, Iva Ropati, Mike Patton, Whetu Taewa, Kelly Shelford, Stu Galbraith, John Lomax, Fisher, Simcott, Taime Tagaloa, Logan Edwards, Tony Tuimavave. Res - Rodger, Quentin Pongia

Great Britain:  Roger Simpson, Paul Eastwood, Shaun Irwin, Daryl Powell, John Devereux, Jonathan Davies, Deryck Fox, Roy Powell, Lee Jackson, Karl Fairbank, Phil Clarke, Ian Smales, David Bishop. Res - Gary Price

First Test

Wellington:  Peter Edwards, Molemau, David Ewe, Morvin Edwards, Victor Aramoana, Gilbert, Geoffrey Tangira, John Lomax, Barry Harvey (c), Robert Piva, O'Sullivan, Esene Faimalo, Mike Kuiti.

Great Britain:  David Lyon, Paul Eastwood, Shaun Irwin, Daryl Powell, John Devereux, Jonathan Davies, Deryck Fox, Ian Lucas, Lee Jackson, Karl Fairbank, Ian Smales, Gary Price, Phil Clarke Res - Paul Dixon, David Bishop

New Zealand Māori:  Morvin Edwards, Sean Hoppe, Nahu, Dave Watson, Victor Aramoana, Kelly Shelford, Geoffrey Tangira, John Lomax, Barry Harvey, Jason Lowrie, Tawera Nikau, Mike Kuiti, Ramsey.

Great Britain:  Chris Bibb, Paul Eastwood, Carl Gibson, Daryl Powell, Martin Offiah, Garry Schofield, Deryck Fox, Roy Powell, Martin Dermott, Keith England, Denis Betts, Paul Dixon, Mike Gregory (c). Res - Bobbie Goulding, Joe Lydon

Taranaki:  Tumoana, W. Tangira, Gwiazdzinski, Dave Watson, R. Nixon, Smith, Geoffrey Tangira, Robert Piva, Mason, Katene, McAllister, Kitto, Barry Harvey. Res - Martin, Jackson.

Great Britain:  Chris Bibb, Paul Eastwood, Shaun Irwin, David Lyon, John Devereux, Roger Simpson, Deryck Fox, Ian Lucas, Ian Smales, Karl Fairbank, Gary Price, Phil Clarke, David Bishop. Res - Roy Powell, Martin Dermott

Second Test
Former All Black fullback Matthew Ridge made his test debut for New Zealand in the second test. To this point in his career, Ridge had only played 6 games of rugby league for NSWRL club Manly-Warringah before becoming a dual international. His selection saw his Manly team mate Darrell Williams moved from fullback to the centres. Ridge, who would end his rugby league career in 1999 having scored over 1,600 points (with a goal kicking accuracy of around 80%), also took over the goal kicking from Peter Brown.

Third Test
This was part of the 1989-1992 Rugby League World Cup

Notes

References

External links
Great Britain/England Test Match Results & Match Details
New Zealand vs Great Britain 1990 at rugbyleagueproject.org

Great Britain national rugby league team tours
Rugby league tours of New Zealand
Rugby league tours of Papua New Guinea
New Zealand–United Kingdom relations
Papua New Guinea–United Kingdom relations
Great Britain Lions tour
Great Britain Lions tour
Great Britain Lions tour
Great Britain Lions tour